The 2021 Arizona Diamondbacks season was the franchise's 23rd season in Major League Baseball and their 23rd season at Chase Field in Phoenix, Arizona as members of the National League West Division. They were managed by Torey Lovullo in his fifth season with the franchise.

On June 17, 2021, with a 10–3 loss to the Giants, the team broke a dubious modern-day record of most consecutive road losses in the modern era, with 23 (and would eventually reach 24, equalling the all-time record with the 1889 Louisville Colonels). The record was previously held by the 1943 Philadelphia Athletics and the 1963 New York Mets. One day later, they set a franchise record with their fifteenth consecutive loss, home or away. The streak would eventually reach 17.

On August 14, 2021, Tyler Gilbert threw the third no-hitter in Diamondbacks history. This was the first time he started in the Major Leagues, and the second no-hitter thrown at Chase Field. The Diamondbacks finished the 2021 season in fifth place in the National League West, with a 52–110 record, one game shy of tying their franchise-worst 2004 season, 51-111.

Season standings

National League West

National League Wild Card

Record vs. opponents

Regular season

Game log 

|- style="background:#fbb;"
| 1 || April 1 || @ Padres || 7–8 || Pagán (1–0) || Young (0–1) || Melancon (1) || 8,773 || 0–1 || L1
|- style="background:#fbb;"
| 2 || April 2 || @ Padres || 2–4 || Pagán (2–0) || Kelly (0–1) || Melancon (2) || 10,350 || 0–2 || L2
|- style="background:#fbb;"
| 3 || April 3 || @ Padres || 0–7 || Musgrove (1–0) || C. Smith (0–1) || Weathers (1) || 10,350 || 0–3 || L3
|- style="background:#bfb;"
| 4 || April 4 || @ Padres || 3–1 || Widener (1–0) || Paddack (0–1) || Devenski (1) || 10,350 || 1–3 || W1
|- style="background:#bfb;"
| 5 || April 6 || @ Rockies || 10–8  || Peacock (1–0) || Bowden (0–1) || — || 10,240 || 2–3 || W2
|- style="background:#fbb;"
| 6 || April 7 || @ Rockies || 0–8 || Senzatela (1–1) || Bumgarner (0–1) || — || 12,894 || 2–4 || L1
|- style="background:#fbb;"
| 7 || April 8 || @ Rockies || 3–7 || Gray (1–0) || Kelly (0–2) || Bard (2) || 10,836 || 2–5 || L2
|- style="background:#fbb;" 
| 8 || April 9 || Reds || 5–6  || Pérez (1–0) || Young (0–2) || Garrett (2) || 19,385 || 2–6 || L3
|- style="background:#bfb;"
| 9 || April 10 || Reds || 8–3 || R. Smith (1–0) || Hoffman (1–0) || — || 13,208 || 3–6 || W1
|- style="background:#bfb;" 
| 10 || April 11 || Reds || 7–0 || Weaver (1–0) || De León (0–1) || — || 10,981 || 4–6 || W2
|- style="background:#fbb;" 
| 11 || April 12 || Athletics || 5–9 || Bassitt (1–2) || Bumgarner (0–2) || — || 8,768 || 4–7 || L1
|- style="background:#fbb;"
| 12 || April 13 || Athletics || 5–7 || Petit (3–0) || Swarzak (0–1) || Trivino (1) || 7,010 || 4–8 || L2
|- style="background:#bfb;"
| 13 || April 15 || @ Nationals || 11–6 || Kelly (1–2) || Corbin (0–2) || — || 6,666 || 5–8 || W1
|- style="background:#fbb;"
| 14 || April 16 || @ Nationals || 0–1 || Hand (1–0) || Young (0–3) || — || 8,056 || 5–9 || L1
|- style="background:#fbb;"
| 15 || April 17 || @ Nationals || 2–6 || Fedde (1–1) || Weaver (1–1) || — || 8,305 || 5–10 || L2
|- style="background:#bfb;"
| 16 || April 18 || @ Nationals || 5–2 || Bumgarner (1–2) || Espino (0–1) || Crichton (1) || 8,478 || 6–10 || W1
|- style="background:#bbb;" 
| — || April 20 || @ Reds || colspan=7 | Suspended (Rain, continuation date: April 21)
|- style="background:#bfb;"
| 17 || April 21  || @ Reds || 5–4 || Bukauskas (1–0) || Garrett (0–1) || Crichton (2) || 8,085 || 7–10 || W2
|- style="background:#bfb;"
| 18 || April 21  || @ Reds || 8–5  || Clarke (1–0) || Pérez (1–2) || — || 8,025 || 8–10 || W3
|- style="background:#bfb;"
| 19 || April 22 || @ Reds || 14–11  || C. Smith (1–1) || Sims (0–1) || — || 7,549 || 9–10 || W4
|- style="background:#fbb;"
| 20 || April 23 || @ Braves || 4–5 || Ynoa (1–1) || Weaver (1–2) || Smith (4) || 19,258 || 9–11 || L1
|- style="background:#bbb;"
| — || April 24 || @ Braves || colspan=7 | Postponed (Rain, makeup date: April 25)
|- style="background:#bfb;"
| 21 || April 25  || @ Braves || 5–0  || Gallen (1–0) || Wilson (1–1) || — || N/A || 10–11 || W1
|- style="background:#bfb;" 
| 22 || April 25  || @ Braves || 7–0  || Bumgarner (2–2) || Smyly (0–1) || — || 20,693 || 11–11 || W2
|- style="background:#bfb;" 
| 23 || April 27 || Padres || 5–1 || Kelly (2–2) || Paddack (1–3) || — || 10,486 || 12–11 || W3
|- style="background:#fbb;"
| 24 || April 28 || Padres || 3–12 || Northcraft (1–0) || R. Smith (1–1) || — || 9,495 || 12–12 || L1
|- style="background:#bfb;" 
| 25 || April 29 || Rockies || 5–3 || C. Smith (2–1) || Stephenson (0–1) || Crichton (3) || 6,843 || 13–12 || W1
|- style="background:#bfb;" 
| 26 || April 30 || Rockies || 7–2 || Bumgarner (3–2) || Gray (3–2) || — || 13,184 || 14–12 || W2
|-

|- style="background:#fbb;"
| 27 || May 1 || Rockies || 6–14 || Gomber (2–3) || Gallen (1–1) || — || 15,734 || 14–13 || L1
|- style="background:#bfb;" 
| 28 || May 2 || Rockies || 8–4 || Devenski (1–0) || Bard (1–2) || — || 11,395 || 15–13 || W1
|- style="background:#fbb;" 
| 29 || May 4 || @ Marlins || 3–9 || Bleier (2–0) || Ginkel (0–1) || — || 3,893 || 15–14 || L1
|- style="background:#fbb;" 
| 30 || May 5 || @ Marlins || 0–8 || Holloway (1–0) || Weaver (1–3) || — || 3,573 || 15–15 || L2
|- style="background:#fbb;" 
| 31 || May 6 || @ Marlins || 1–3 || Floro (2–1) || Bukauskas (1–1) || García (5) || 4,049 || 15–16 || L3
|- style="background:#fbb;"
| 32 || May 7 || @ Mets || 4–5  || Loup (1–0) || Crichton (0–1) || — || 7,662 || 15–17 || L4
|- style="background:#fbb;" 
| 33 || May 8 || @ Mets || 2–4 || Lucchesi (1–2) || Kelly (2–3) || May (1) || 7,908 || 15–18 || L5
|- style="background:#fbb;" 
| 34 || May 9 || @ Mets || 2–4 || deGrom (3–2) || R. Smith (1–2) || Díaz (5) || 7,880 || 15–19 || L6
|- style="background:#bfb;" 
| 35 || May 10 || Marlins || 5–2 || Weaver (2–3) || Holloway (1–1) || Crichton (4) || 6,307 || 16–19 || W1
|- style="background:#bfb;"
| 36 || May 11 || Marlins || 11–3 || Bumgarner (4–2) || López (0–3) || — || 5,560 || 17–19 || W2
|- style="background:#fbb;" 
| 37 || May 12 || Marlins || 2–3 || Poteet (1–0) || Peacock (1–1) || García (6) || 5,714 || 17–20 || L1
|- style="background:#fbb;" 
| 38 || May 13 || Marlins || 1–5 || Rogers (5–2) || Kelly (2–4) || — || 5,967 || 17–21 || L2
|- style="background:#fbb;" 
| 39 || May 14 || Nationals || 2–17 || Scherzer (3–2) || R. Smith (1–3) || — || 11,907 || 17–22 || L3
|- style="background:#bfb;" 
| 40 || May 15 || Nationals || 11–4 || Young (1–3) || Ross (2–3) || — || 13,462 || 18–22 || W1
|- style="background:#fbb;" 
| 41 || May 16 || Nationals || 0–3 || Fedde (3–4) || Crichton (0–2) || Hand (4) || 11,619 || 18–23 || L1
|- style="background:#fbb;" 
| 42 || May 17 || @ Dodgers || 1–3 || Buehler (2–0) || Bumgarner (4–3) || Jansen (8) || 14,088 || 18–24 || L2
|- style="background:#fbb;" 
| 43 || May 18 || @ Dodgers || 1–9 || Urías (6–1) || Martin (0–1) || — || 15,313 || 18–25 || L3
|- style="background:#fbb;" 
| 44 || May 19 || @ Dodgers || 2–4 || Kelly (1–0) || Mantiply (0–1) || Jansen (9) || 15,586 || 18–26 || L4
|- style="background:#fbb;" 
| 45 || May 20 || @ Dodgers || 2–3 || González (1–0) || Kelly (2–5) || Jansen (10) || 16,105 || 18–27 || L5
|- style="background:#fbb;" 
| 46 || May 21 || @ Rockies || 1–7 || Márquez (3–4) || Frankoff (0–1) || — || 18,158 || 18–28 || L6
|- style="background:#fbb;" 
| 47 || May 22 || @ Rockies || 6–7 || Kinley (1–0) || Bumgarner (4–4) || Bard (5) || 20,183 || 18–29 || L7
|- style="background:#fbb;" 
| 48 || May 23 || @ Rockies || 3–4 || Bard (2–3) || Crichton (0–3) || — || 19,221 || 18–30 || L8
|- style="background:#fbb;" 
| 49 || May 25 || Giants || 0–8 || Gausman (5–0) || Martin (0–2) || — || 10,311 || 18–31 || L9
|- style="background:#fbb;"
| 50 || May 26 || Giants || 4–5 || Tropeano (1–0) || Young (1–4) || Rogers (6) || 8,597 || 18–32 || L10
|- style="background:#fbb;" 
| 51 || May 27 || Cardinals || 4–5  || Reyes (3–1) || Crichton (0–4) || Ponce de Leon (1) || 8,951 || 18–33 || L11
|- style="background:#fbb;" 
| 52 || May 28 || Cardinals || 6–8 || Woodford (1–0) || Bumgarner (4–5) || Ponce de Leon (2) || 11,581 || 18–34 || L12
|- style="background:#fbb;"
| 53 || May 29 || Cardinals || 4–7 || Wainwright (3–4) || Frankoff (0–2) || Reyes (15) || 17,834 || 18–35 || L13
|- style="background:#bfb;" 
| 54 || May 30 || Cardinals || 9–2 || Peacock (2–1) || Kim (1–3) || R. Smith (1) || 16,681 || 19–35 || W1
|- style="background:#fbb;" 
| 55 || May 31 || Mets || 2–6 || deGrom (4–2) || Kelly (2–6) || — || 11,309 || 19–36 || L1
|-

|- style="background:#bfb;"
| 56 || June 1 || Mets || 6–5  || Young (2–4) || May (2–2) || — || 9,590 || 20–36 || W1
|- style="background:#fbb;" 
| 57 || June 2 || Mets || 6–7 || Castro (2–1) || Soria (0–1) || Díaz (10) || 9,810 || 20–37 || L1
|- style="background:#fbb;" 
| 58 || June 3 || @ Brewers || 4–7 || Suter (6–3) || Duplantier (0–1) || Hader (13) || 12,392 || 20–38 || L2
|- style="background:#fbb;" 
| 59 || June 4 || @ Brewers || 1–5 || Peralta (6–1) || Peacock (2–2) || — || 15,261 || 20–39 || L3
|- style="background:#fbb;" 
| 60 || June 5 || @ Brewers || 5–7 || Williams (2–0) || Soria (0–2) || Hader (14) || 20,073 || 20–40 || L4
|- style="background:#fbb;" 
| 61 || June 6 || @ Brewers || 0–2 || Burnes (3–4) || C. Smith (2–2) || Boxberger (2) || 20,117 || 20–41 || L5
|- style="background:#fbb;" 
| 62 || June 8 || @ Athletics || 2–5 || Bassitt (6–2) || Duplantier (0–2) || Trivino (9) || 3,695 || 20–42 || L6
|- style="background:#fbb;" 
| 63 || June 9 || @ Athletics || 0–4 || Manaea (5–2) || Peacock (2–3) || — || 4,090 || 20–43 || L7
|- style="background:#fbb;"
| 64 || June 11 || Angels || 5–6 || Iglesias (4–2) || Buchter (0–1) || Claudio (1) || 18,458 || 20–44 || L8
|- style="background:#fbb;" 
| 65 || June 12 || Angels || 7–8 || Claudio (1–1) || Soria (0–3) || Iglesias (11) || 13,863 || 20–45 || L9
|- style="background:#fbb;"
| 66 || June 13 || Angels || 3–10 || Sandoval (1–2) || Duplantier (0–3) || — || 12,768 || 20–46 || L10
|- style="background:#fbb;" 
| 67 || June 14 || @ Giants || 2–5 || Wood (6–3) || Peacock (2–4) || McGee (13) || 9,906 || 20–47 || L11
|- style="background:#fbb;" 
| 68 || June 15 || @ Giants || 8–9 || Sherfy (1–0) || Castellanos (0–1) || Rogers (9) || 9,867 || 20–48 || L12
|- style="background:#fbb;" 
| 69 || June 16 || @ Giants || 7–13 || DeSclafani (7–2) || Kelly (2–7) || — || 11,004 || 20–49 || L13
|- style="background:#fbb;" 
| 70 || June 17 || @ Giants || 3–10 || Gausman (8–1) || Gallen (1–2) || — || 13,144 || 20–50 || L14
|- style="background:#fbb;" 
| 71 || June 18 || Dodgers || 0–3 || Bauer (7–5) || Mantiply (0–2) || Jansen (17) || 25,356 || 20–51 || L15
|- style="background:#fbb;" 
| 72 || June 19 || Dodgers || 3–9 || Buehler (7–0) || Peacock (2–5) || — || 29,904 || 20–52 || L16
|- style="background:#fbb;" 
| 73 || June 20 || Dodgers || 8–9 || Cleavinger (2–3) || Young (2–5) || Jansen (18) || 31,661 || 20–53 || L17
|- style="background:#bfb;" 
| 74 || June 21 || Brewers || 5–1 || Kelly (3–7) || Anderson (2–5) || — || 9,804 || 21–53 || W1
|- style="background:#fbb;" 
| 75 || June 22 || Brewers || 0–5 || Peralta (7–2) || Gallen (1–3) || — || 9,358 || 21–54 || L1
|- style="background:#fbb;" 
| 76 || June 23 || Brewers || 2–3 || Woodruff (6–3) || C. Smith (2–3) || Hader (19) || 8,676 || 21–55 || L2
|- style="background:#fbb;" 
| 77 || June 25 || @ Padres || 5–11 || Ramirez (1–1) || Martin (0–3) || — || 32,583 || 21–56 || L3
|- style="background:#bfb;" 
| 78 || June 26 || @ Padres || 10–1 || Kelly (4–7) || Lamet (2–3) || — || 40,557 || 22–56 || W1
|- style="background:#fbb;" 
| 79 || June 27 || @ Padres || 4–5 || Hill (5–3) || Peacock (2–6) || Melancon (24) || 34,905 || 22–57 || L1
|- style="background:#fbb;" 
| 80 || June 28 || @ Cardinals || 1–7 || Gallegos (5–1) || Young (2–6) || — || 27,175 || 22–58 || L2
|- style="background:#fbb;" 
| 81 || June 29 || @ Cardinals || 2–3 || Martínez (4–9) || C. Smith (2–4) || Reyes (19) || 28,740 || 22–59 || L3
|- style="background:#fbb;" 
| 82 || June 30 || @ Cardinals || 4–7 || Kim (2–5) || R. Smith (1–4) || Reyes (20) || 27,235 || 22–60 || L4
|-

|- style="background:#bfb;" 
| 83 || July 1 || Giants || 5–3 || Kelly (5–7) || Cueto (6–4) || Soria (1) || 9,172 || 23–60 || W1
|- style="background:#fbb;" 
| 84 || July 2 || Giants || 4–11 || Wood (7–3) || Gallen (1–4) || — || 12,262 || 23–61 || L1
|- style="background:#fbb;"
| 85 || July 3 || Giants || 5–6 || Leone (2–0) || Buchter (0–2) || McGee (16) || 23,689 || 23–62 || L2
|- style="background:#fbb;"
| 86 || July 4 || Giants || 2–5 || DeSclafani (9–3) || C. Smith (2–5) || Rogers (10) || 27,032 || 23–63 || L3
|- style="background:#bfb;" 
| 87 || July 6 || Rockies || 4–3 || Soria (1–3) || Bard (4–5) || — || 6,847 || 24–63 || W1
|- style="background:#bfb;" 
| 88 || July 7 || Rockies || 6–4 || Peacock (3–6) || Senzatela (2–8) || Soria (2) || 7,852 || 25–63 || W2
|- style="background:#fbb;" 
| 89 || July 8 || Rockies || 3–9 || Gonzalez (3–5) || Weems (0–1) || — || 7,740 || 25–64 || L1
|- style="background:#bfb;" 
| 90 || July 9 || @ Dodgers || 5–2 || de Geus (1–0) || Nuñez (0–1) || Soria (3) || 49,215 || 26–64 || W1
|- style="background:#fbb;"
| 91 || July 10 || @ Dodgers || 1–22 || Buehler (9–1) || C. Smith (2–6) || — || 44,654 || 26–65 || L1
|- style="background:#fbb;" 
| 92 || July 11 || @ Dodgers || 4–7 || Jansen (1–2) || Bukauskas (1–2) || — || 40,464 || 26–66 || L2
|- style="background:#bbcaff 
| – || July 13 || colspan="9" | 91st All-Star Game in Denver, CO
|- style="background:#fbb;" 
| 93 || July 16 || Cubs || 1–5 || Hendricks (12–4) || Bumgarner (4–6) || — || 22,046 || 26–67 || L3
|- style="background:#fbb;" 
| 94 || July 17 || Cubs || 2–4 || Brothers (3–2) || Soria (1–4) || Kimbrel (21) || 20,180 || 26–68 || L4
|- style="background:#bfb;" 
| 95 || July 18 || Cubs || 6–4 || Kelly (6–7) || Winkler (1–2) || Soria (4) || 21,457 || 27–68 || W1
|- style="background:#bfb;" 
| 96 || July 19 || Pirates || 4–2 || C. Smith (3–6) || De Jong (1–4) || Soria (5) || 9,173 || 28–68 || W2
|- style="background:#bfb;" 
| 97 || July 20 || Pirates || 11–6 || Bukauskas (2–2) || Davis (0–1) || — || 7,283 || 29–68 || W3
|- style="background:#bfb;" 
| 98 || July 21 || Pirates || 6–4 || de Geus (2–0) || Underwood Jr. (2–3) || Soria (6) || 7,863 || 30–68 || W4
|- style="background:#fbb;" 
| 99 || July 23 || @ Cubs || 3–8 || Davies (6–6) || Gallen (1–5) || Thompson (1) || 34,059 || 30–69 || L1
|- style="background:#bfb;"
| 100 || July 24 || @ Cubs || 7–3 || Kelly (7–7) || Chafin (0–2) || — || 37,190 || 31–69 || W1
|- style="background:#fbb;" 
| 101 || July 25 || @ Cubs || 1–5 || Williams (4–2) || C. Smith (3–7) || Kimbrel (23) || 32,602 || 31–70 || L1
|- style="background:#fbb;"
| 102 || July 27 || @ Rangers || 4–5 || Dunning (4–7) || Widener (1–1) || Kennedy (16) || 27,336 || 31–71 || L2
|- style="background:#bfb;" 
| 103 || July 28 || @ Rangers || 3–2 || Bumgarner (5–6) || Martin (2–3) || Clippard (1) || 26,607 || 32–71 || W1
|- style="background:#bfb;"
| 104 || July 30 || Dodgers || 6–5  || Peacock (4–6) || Nelson (1–2) || — || 20,780 || 33–71 || W2
|- style="background:#fbb;"
| 105 || July 31 || Dodgers || 3–8 || Vesia (1–1) || Kelly (7–8) || — || 23,814 || 33–72 || L1
|-

|- style="background:#fbb;" 
| 106 || August 1 || Dodgers || 0–13 || Urías (13–3) || C. Smith (3–8) || — || 17,195 || 33–73 || L2
|- style="background:#fbb;”
| 107 || August 2 || Giants || 8–11  || García (3–2) || Aguilar (0–1) || — || 8,904 || 33–74 || L3
|- style="background:#bfb;" 
| 108 || August 3 || Giants || 3–1 || Bumgarner (6–6) || Cueto (7–6) || Clippard (2) || 8,809 || 34–74 || W1
|- style="background:#fbb;"
| 109 || August 4 || Giants || 1–7 || Gausman (10–5) || Gallen (1–6) || — || 8,091 || 34–75 || L1
|- style="background:#fbb;"
| 110 || August 5 || Giants || 4–5  || Rogers (3–1) || Gilbert (0–1) || McGee (24) || 8,773 || 34–76 || L2
|- style="background:#bfb;"  
| 111 || August 6 || @ Padres || 8–5 || Peacock (5–6) || Weathers (4–4) || Poppen (1) || 34,038 || 35–76 || W1
|- style="background:#fbb;" 
| 112 || August 7 || @ Padres || 2–6 || Pomeranz (1–0) || de Geus (2–1) || — || 39,134 || 35–77 || L1
|- style="background:#fbb;" 
| 113 || August 8 || @ Padres || 0–2 || Snell (6–4) || Bumgarner (6–7) || Melancon (33) || 30,989 || 35–78 || L2
|- style="background:#fbb;" 
| 114 || August 10 || @ Giants || 7–8 || Littell (1–0) || Peacock (5–7) || — || 23,802 || 35–79 || L3
|- style="background:#fbb;" 
| 115 || August 11 || @ Giants || 2–7 || Gausman (11–5) || Kelly (7–9) || — || 20,037 || 35–80 || L5
|- style="background:#bfb;" 
| 116 || August 12 || Padres || 12–3 || C. Smith (4–8) || Darvish (7–7) || — || 9,086 || 36–80 || W1
|- style="background:#bfb;"
| 117 || August 13 || Padres || 3–2 || Clippard (1–0) || Stammen (5–3) || — || 12,866 || 37–80 || W2
|- style="background:#bfb;" 
| 118 || August 14 || Padres || 7–0 || Gilbert (1–1) || Musgrove (8–8) || — || 16,716 || 38–80 || W3
|- style="background:#fbb;" 
| 119 || August 15 || Padres || 2–8 || Knehr (1–0) || Gallen (1–7) || — || 17,722 || 38–81 || L1
|- style="background:#bfb;" 
| 120 || August 17 || Phillies || 3–2 || Aguilar (1–1) || Gibson (8–5) || Clippard (3) || 7,796 || 39–81 || W1
|- style="background:#bfb;"
| 121 || August 18 || Phillies || 4–2 || Castellanos (1–1) || Suárez (5–4) || Clippard (4) || 7,968 || 40–81 || W2
|- style="background:#bfb;" 
| 122 || August 19 || Phillies || 6–2 || Bumgarner (7–7) || Wheeler (10–8) || — || 7,165 || 41–81 || W3
|- style="background:#fbb;" 
| 123 || August 20 || @ Rockies || 4–9 || Stephenson (1–1) || de Geus (2–2) || — || 30,243 || 41–82 || L1
|- style="background:#fbb;"  
| 124 || August 21 || @ Rockies || 2–5 || Bard (7–5) || Wendelken (2–2) || — || 32,699 || 41–83 || L2
|- style="background:#bfb;" 
| 125 || August 22 || @ Rockies || 8–4 || Widener (2–1) || Gray (7–10) || — || 24,552 || 42–83 || W1
|- style="background:#fbb;"
| 126 || August 23 || @ Pirates || 5–6 || Banda (2–0) || Ramirez (0–1) || Bednar (2) || 8,596 || 42–84 || L1
|- style="background:#fbb;" 
| 127 || August 24 || @ Pirates || 2–4 || Brubaker (5–13) || Bumgarner (7–8) || Stratton (2) || 8,478 || 42–85 || L2
|- style="background:#bfb;" 
| 128 || August 25 || @ Pirates || 5–2 || de Geus (3–2) || Banda (2–1) || Clippard (5) || 8,357 || 43–85 || W1
|- style="background:#bfb;"
| 129 || August 26 || @ Phillies || 8–7 || Gallen (2–7) || Moore (2–4) || Ramirez (1) || 20,148 || 44–85 || W2
|- style="background:#fbb;"
| 130 || August 27 || @ Phillies || 6–7  || De Los Santos (1–1) || Clarke (1–1) || — || 23,181 || 44–86 || L1
|- style="background:#fbb;" 
| 131 || August 28 || @ Phillies || 0–7 || Gibson (10–5) || Mejía (0–1) || — || 24,692 || 44–87 || L2
|- style="background:#fbb;" 
| 132 || August 29 || @ Phillies || 4–7 || Suárez (6–4) || Bumgarner (7–9) || Kennedy (21) || 22,237 || 44–88 || L3
|- style="background:#fbb;" 
| 133 || August 30 || Padres || 5–7 || Stammen (6–3) || Gilbert (1–2) || Melancon (35) || 8,482 || 44–89 || L4
|- style="background:#fbb;" 
| 134 || August 31 || Padres || 0–3 || Snell (7–5) || Gallen (2–8) || Melancon (36) || 10,818 || 44–90 || L5
|-

|- style="background:#bfb;" 
| 135 || September 1 || Padres || 8–3 || Weaver (3–3) || Darvish (7–9) || — || 5,945 || 45–90 || W1
|- style="background:#fbb;" 
| 136 || September 3 || Mariners || 5–6  || Sheffield (7–8) || Clarke (1–2) || Ramírez (2) || 12,729 || 45–91 || L1
|- style="background:#fbb;" 
| 137 || September 4 || Mariners || 5–8 || Gonzales (7–5) || C. Smith (4–9) || Castillo (16) || 18,819 || 45–92 || L2
|- style="background:#fbb;"
| 138 || September 5 || Mariners || 4–10  || Ramírez (1–2) || Clarke (1–3) || — || 14,408 || 45–93 || L3
|- style="background:#fbb;" 
| 139 || September 7 || Rangers || 1–3 || Lyles (8–11) || Gallen (2–9) || — || 8,758 || 45–94 || L4
|- style="background:#fbb;" 
| 140 || September 8 || Rangers || 5–8 || Cotton (1–0) || Weaver (3–4) || Barlow (4) || 6,354 || 45–95 || L5
|- style="background:#fbb;"
| 141 || September 10 || @ Mariners || 4–5 || Gonzales (8–5) || Bumgarner (7–10) || Steckenrider (8) || 14,379 || 45–96 || L6
|- style="background:#bfb;" 
| 142 || September 11 || @ Mariners || 7–3 || Castellanos (2–1) || Flexen (11–6) || — || 15,483 || 46–96 || W1
|- style="background:#bfb;"
| 143 || September 12 || @ Mariners || 5–4 || Gilbert (2–2) || Misiewicz (4–5) || Wendelken (1) || 13,551 || 47–96 || W2
|- style="background:#fbb;" 
| 144 || September 13 || @ Dodgers || 1–5 || Bickford (4–2) || Gallen (2–10) || — || 43,273 || 47–97 || L1
|- style="background:#fbb;" 
| 145 || September 14 || @ Dodgers || 4–8 || Gonsolin (3–1) || Weaver (3–5) || — || 44,630 || 47–98 || L2
|- style="background:#fbb;"
| 146 || September 15 || @ Dodgers || 3–5 || Urías (18–3) ||  Kelly (7–10) || Jansen (33) || 46,520 || 47–99 || L3
|- style="background:#fbb;" 
| 147 || September 17 || @ Astros || 3–4  || Stanek (3–4) || Clippard (1–1) || — || 22,595 || 47–100 || L4
|- style="background:#bfb;" 
| 148 || September 18 || @ Astros || 6–4  || Wendelken (3–2) || García (3–9) || Clippard (6) || 25,314 || 48–100 || W1
|- style="background:#fbb;" 
| 149 || September 19 || @ Astros || 6–7 || Solomon (1–0) || Sittinger (0–1) || Pressly (25) || 23,888 || 48–101 || L1
|- style="background:#fbb;" 
| 150 || September 20 || Braves || 4–11 || Webb (5–2) || Mejía (0–2) || — || 9,642 || 48–102 || L2
|- style="background:#fbb;" 
| 151 || September 21 || Braves || 1–6 || Smyly (10–4) || Weaver (3–6) || — || 8,879 || 48–103 || L3
|- style="background:#fbb;" 
| 152 || September 22 || Braves || 2–9 || Anderson (8–5) || Kelly (7–11) || — || 10,631 || 48–104 || L4
|- style="background:#bfb;" 
| 153 || September 23 || Braves || 6–4 || Poppen (1–0) || Webb (5–4) || Wendelken (2) || 6,880 || 49–104 || W1
|- style="background:#fbb;" 
| 154 || September 24 || Dodgers || 2–4 || Gonsolin (4–1) || Castellanos (2–2) || Jansen (35) || 19,001 || 49–105 || L1
|- style="background:#bfb;" 
| 155 || September 25 || Dodgers || 7–2 || Gallen (3–10) || Kershaw (10–8) || — || 28,026 || 50–105 || W1
|- style="background:#fbb;" 
| 156 || September 26 || Dodgers || 0–3 || Urías (19–3) || Mejía (0–3) || Jansen (36) || 16,648 || 50–106 || L1
|- style="background:#fbb;" 
| 157 || September 28 || @ Giants || 4–6 || Álvarez (5–2) || Poppen (1–1) || Doval (1) || 28,122 || 50–107 || L2
|- style="background:#fbb;" 
| 158 || September 29 || @ Giants || 0–1 || Leone (4–5) || Ramirez (0–2) || Doval (2) || 23,110 || 50–108 || L3
|- style="background:#fbb;" 
| 159 || September 30 || @ Giants || 4–5 || Rogers (7–1) || Mantiply (0–3) || — || 27,503 || 50–109 || L4
|-

|- style="background:#fbb;" 
| 160 || October 1 || Rockies || 7–9 || Gilbreath (3–2) || Wendelken (3–3) || Estévez (11) || 15,189 || 50–110 || L5
|- style="background:#bfb;" 
| 161 || October 2 || Rockies || 11–2 || Gallen (4–10) || Senzatela (4–10) || — || 19,418 || 51–110 || W1
|- style="background:#bfb;" 
| 162 || October 3 || Rockies || 5–4 || Wendelken (4–3) || Estévez (3–5) || — || 12,565 || 52–110 || W2
|-

|-
| Legend:       = Win       = Loss       = PostponementBold = Diamondbacks team member

Opening day

Roster

Minor league affiliations

References

External links
Arizona Diamondbacks 2021 schedule at MLB.com
2021 Arizona Diamondbacks season at Baseball Reference

Arizona Diamondbacks
Arizona Diamondbacks
Arizona Diamondbacks seasons